Ciaotou is a railway station in Kaohsiung, Taiwan served by the TRA and Kaohsiung MRT; it can also be transliterated as Qiaotou Station.

This three-level station serves the TRA and Kaohsiung MRT. TRA services operate at ground-level platforms, while KMRT services operate on an elevated platform. The KMRT station is elevated with an island platform. It is located on Zhanqian St. and has two exits. The station is 185 meters long.

History

TRA Station
 1901-05-15: Opened for service.

KMRT Station
 2008-03-09 : Red Line between Ciaotou and Siaogang opened.

Around the station
 Qiaotou Township Office
 Taiwan Sugar Kaohsiung Factory
 Qiaotou Junior High School
Qiaotou Junior High School Swimming Pool
 Qiaotou Elementary School
 Qiaotou Old Street
 Station Front Retail Building
 Hongren Hospital
 Taiwan Power Company Service Office
 Taiwan Sugar Museum (Kaohsiung)

See also
 List of railway stations in Taiwan

References

External links

TRA Ciaotou Station
Taiwan Railways Administration
KRTC Ciaotou Station 

1901 establishments in Taiwan
Kaohsiung Metro Red line stations
Railway stations in Kaohsiung
Railway stations opened in 1901
Railway stations served by Taiwan Railways Administration